The 1951 All-Ireland Junior Hurling Championship was the 30th staging of the All-Ireland Junior Championship since its establishment by the Gaelic Athletic Association in 1912.

Mayo entered the championship as the defending champions, however, they were beaten by Cork in the All-Ireland home final.

The All-Ireland final was played on 30 September 1951 at the Athletic Grounds in Cork, between Cork and Warwickshire, in what was their first ever meeting in the final. Cork won the match by 5–11 to 1–03 to claim their first ever championship title.

Results

All-Ireland Junior Football Championship

All-Ireland semi-finals

All-Ireland home final

All-Ireland final

References

Junior
All-Ireland Junior Football Championship